Thomson Road is a road in Wan Chai, Hong Kong Island, Hong Kong. It was named on 30 October 1931 after Alexander MacDonald Thomson, a Colonial Treasurer of Hong Kong from 1899 to 1918.

It has been separated into two sections since Southorn Playground was built in 1932.

Name
The name of road was gazetted in October 1931. Hon. Alexander MacDonald Thomson first appeared in colonial service in 1887 in a lowly capacity. By July 1898, he was Acting Colonial Treasurer and Collector of Stamp Revenue and he stood in for a few months as Acting Colonial Secretary for Sir Henry May in 1909, then twice more in 1910 and 1912. When Thomson retired in 1918, he was Colonial Treasurer. He had a pension of HK$4,200 per annum.

See also
 List of streets and roads in Hong Kong

References 

Wan Chai
Roads on Hong Kong Island